Colin Hawley (born April 10, 1987 in Trowbridge, California) is an American former rugby union wing.

Hawley was brought into the USA Eagles Player Pool, and began playing for the US national team while he was still in college. He made his test debut against Georgia in June 2009. He also played with the USA national rugby union team on their 2010 Autumn tour.  Hawley played for the US National Team in the 2011 Rugby World Cup.

Hawley has played with the US national sevens team in several tournaments. US national sevens team Captain Chris Wyles has called Hawley "the next big thing" in USA rugby. Hawley signed a contract to play for the US national rugby sevens team in January 2012, and had been a full-time player under contract for the US since then.

Youth and college rugby
Hawley grew up in East Nicolaus, a rural area outside Sacramento, California. He attended Jesuit High School (Sacramento), playing both rugby and basketball. He was mentored by teammate Louis Stanfill.

Hawley was named to the Collegiate All-Americans (2007–2010) and team MVP (2007) while playing for the University of California Golden Bears which won the NCAA Rugby National Championship in 2010. Hawley played for Cal in the 2010 Collegiate Rugby Championship, helping lead the team to the finals, and was selected to the All-Tournament Team.

Hawley graduated from the University of California, Berkeley, in 2010 with a degree in Political Science.

Family
Colin's father Loren Hawley, who died in April 2008 due to throat cancer, was also a rugby player for the California Golden Bears from 1962–1965. In speaking of his father during a 2009 interview, Hawley said, "I went to Jesuit and played rugby because my dad and all his friends played at Cal. From there he was my personal rugby guru. He couldn’t talk so he would write pages of notes on his take of the game and what I needed to do. After every game he would come over and ask me what I thought, then he would give his insights. He was a great teacher and coach."

Hawley's mother, Rita Currie, is from Phoenix, AZ.

Hawley has a brother Garrett, who played for the San Francisco Golden Gate under-23 side.

Colin also has a half brother named Jason Everitt.

Competition history
 2008 – Center/Fullback for California Golden Bears rugby in international collegiate matches in New Zealand
 2008 – Center/Fullback for California Golden Bears rugby in the collegiate rugby national championship
 2009 – Wing in USA Eagles Test
 2009 – Wing for USA Eagles in the Churchill Cup in Denver, Colorado. He scored a try in his debut at the tournament.
 2010 – Center/Fullback for California Golden Bears rugby in the collegiate rugby national championship against the BYU Rugby team
 2010 – Wing for USA Sevens in Taiwan
 2011 – Wing for USA Sevens at the Pan American Games in Guadalajara, Mexico
 2011 – Wing for USA Eagles in the Churchill Cup in England, where he scored a try against Uruguay.
 2011 – Wing for USA Eagles at the 2011 Rugby World Cup in New Zealand. He made his debut against Australia.
 2011 – Wing for the USA Sevens in the Sevens tournament, where he scored a try against Portugal.

See also
 United States national rugby sevens team
 United States at the Rugby World Cup
 Collegiate Rugby Championship
 California Golden Bears rugby

References

External links
 
 Player Profile from scrum.com
 Cal Rugby: 2010 National Championship – Post Game Interviews
 Kelley L Cox Adventures of a Bay Area Photographer USA vs. Uruguay photos

Living people
American rugby union players
Rugby sevens players at the 2011 Pan American Games
United States international rugby union players
1987 births
United States international rugby sevens players
Pan American Games medalists in rugby sevens
Pan American Games bronze medalists for the United States
Medalists at the 2011 Pan American Games